The men's 50 m apnoea competition in finswimming at the 2013 World Games took place on 27 July 2013 at the Hernando Botero Swimming Pool in Cali, Colombia.

Competition format
A total of 12 athletes entered the competition. The best eight athletes from preliminary round qualifies to the final.

Results

Preliminary

Final

References

External links
 Results on IWGA website

Finswimming at the 2013 World Games